Harry Surtees Altham  (30 November 1888 – 11 March 1965) was an English cricketer who became an important figure in the game as an administrator, historian and coach. His Wisden obituary described him as "among the best known personalities in the world of cricket". He died of a heart attack just after he had given an address to a cricket society.

Altham was educated at Repton School and Trinity College, Oxford, and served in the British Army during World War I as a Major with the 60th Rifles. He was awarded the Distinguished Service Order (DSO) and the Military Cross (MC), and was mentioned in despatches on three occasions. He was a schoolmaster and a cricket coach at Winchester College, a position that he held for thirty years, and was also the housemaster of Chernocke House.

Altham's son, Richard, played in two first-class matches for Oxford University in 1947.

Playing career
Harry Altham was a right-handed batsman. The Repton side which he captained in 1908 has been described as possibly the strongest school eleven of all time. His first-class career lasted from 1908 to 1923. He played for Surrey from 1908 to 1912 and also for Oxford University, obtaining a Blue in 1911 and 1912. On joining the staff at Winchester College, he moved from Surrey to Hampshire and played for Hampshire from 1919 to 1923. Altham played in 55 first-class matches in all, scoring 1,537 runs at an average of 19.70. He made one century, a score of 141 against Kent at Canterbury in 1921.

Administration
Altham served on the Marylebone Cricket Club (MCC) Committee from 1941 until his death in 1965. He was Treasurer from 1949 until 1963 and President in 1959. He was a member of the Hampshire Committee for over forty years and the President of the club from 1946 until his death. He was also Chairman of the English Test selectors in 1954.

Historian
Altham's celebrated History of Cricket began as a serial in The Cricketer magazine and first appeared in book-form in 1926. Revised editions appeared in 1938, this time in collaboration with E.W. Swanton, and then in 1947 and 1948, both with Swanton and in 1948 including an introduction by Pelham Warner. A further revised edition (now in two volumes, the first by Altham covering the period until 1914 and the second by Swanton covering from 1914 onwards) appeared in 1962 and is listed below, along with his histories of Lord's and the MCC, and of Hampshire:

Hampshire County Cricket: The official history of Hampshire County Cricket Club (Phoenix House, 1957).
A History of Cricket with EW Swanton (two volumes, Allen & Unwin, 1962). A paperback edition appeared in 1968.
Lord's and the MCC with John Arlott (Pitkin, 1967).

Swanton himself clarified the nature of Altham's contribution to A History of Cricket. "In the obituary written in the factual, anonymous vein generally adopted by Wisden," he wrote, "I notice for the first time what can only be described as a howler. The second paragraph of the piece begins: 'Altham collaborated with E. W. Swanton in a book, The History of Cricket...' ... The first edition of A History of Cricket (note the indefinite article) was written by Harry when I was a boy. It was twelve years later, in 1938, that he honoured me by asking me to collaborate with him, in a Second Edition. This I did, and so continued with three subsequent editions, as the junior and subservient partner, until the last appeared in two volumes some three years before his death."

The ever-modest Altham, however, provided his own verdict (in the book's fourth edition in 1948): "This not-inconsiderable labour I could not have undertaken by myself, but I was fortunate enough to secure the collaboration of Mr. E. W. Swanton whose broad shoulders readily sustained by far the greater part of the burden."

Writing in 1956, A. A. Thomson said of the History of Cricket that it was "a massive record of the game from first beginnings out to the undiscovered ends, written with authority and affection, accuracy and charm".

A collection of Altham's writing, edited and revised by Hubert Doggart, was published after his death, namely The Heart of Cricket: A memoir of H.S. Altham (Hutchinson 'The Cricketer', 1967).

Coaching
As well as coaching at Winchester for many years, Altham was Chairman of the MCC Youth Cricket Association and President of the English Schools Cricket Association. He was appointed Chairman of a Special Committee to inquire into the future welfare of English cricket in 1949, saying, "If only we can get enough boys playing this game in England, and playing it right, it is quite certain that from the mass will be thrown up in some year or another a new Compton, a new Tate, a new Jack Hobbs, and, when that happens, we need not worry anymore about our meetings with Australia." Perhaps most important of all, Altham was the author of the first edition of the MCC Cricket Coaching Book, published in 1952.

Honours
He was made a Commander of the Order of the British Empire (CBE) in 1957.

References
ALTHAM, Harry Surtees, Who Was Who, A & C Black, 1920–2016 (online edition, Oxford University Press, 2014)

Bibliography
 Altham, H.S.; Swanton, E.W.: A History of Cricket (George Allen & Unwin Ltd., 1948).
 Barclay's World of Cricket – 2nd Edition, 1980, Collins Publishers, p50, p135.
 E.W. Swanton, Cricket from All Angles, Michael Joseph Ltd, 1968, pp261–263. (An obituary that originally appeared in the Daily Telegraph.)

External links
 

1888 births
1965 deaths
Cricket historians and writers
English cricket administrators
English cricket coaches
Presidents of the Marylebone Cricket Club
Free Foresters cricketers
English cricketers
Schoolteachers from Hampshire
Oxford University cricketers
Hampshire cricketers
Surrey cricketers
People educated at Repton School
Alumni of Trinity College, Oxford
King's Royal Rifle Corps officers
British Army personnel of World War I
Commanders of the Order of the British Empire
Companions of the Distinguished Service Order
Recipients of the Military Cross
England cricket team selectors
Marylebone Cricket Club cricketers
Gentlemen of England cricketers
Demobilised Officers cricketers
British Army officers
People from Camberley
Military personnel from Surrey